Rhys Pugsley (born 20 October 1994) was a Welsh former professional rugby league footballer.

Born in Newport, Pugsley attended Caerleon Comprehensive School, and started playing rugby league for local amateur club Newport Titans. In 2011, he joined the academy at Wigan. In 2012, he made his international début for Wales against France on his 18th birthday.

In 2014, he received a two-year ban after testing positive for anabolic steroids. In 2016, he failed a second drugs test after testing positive for the anabolic steroid nandrolone, resulting in a further eight-year ban from all sport.

References

1994 births
Living people
Doping cases in rugby league
People educated at Caerleon Comprehensive School
People from Caerleon
Rugby league players from Newport, Wales
Rugby league props
Rugby league second-rows
Wales national rugby league team players
Welsh rugby league players